The 2019 Premier Volleyball League Reinforced Conference was the seventh conference of the Premier Volleyball League (34th conference of the former Shakey's V-League). Conference started on May 26, 2019. Grand Fans Day was held at the Trinoma Activity Center, Quezon City on April 25, 2019. Games were held at the Filoil Flying V Centre, San Juan, Philippines. Philippine Army returned as Pacific Town-Army Lady Troopers and Motolite Power Builders returned with a new set of players.

Participating teams 

Notes:

Foreign players

Preliminary round 

 Team standings

|}

Point system:
3 points = win match in 3 or 4 sets
2 points = win match in 5 sets
1 point  = lose match in 5 sets
0 point  = lose match in 3 or 4 sets

Match results
All times are in Philippines Standard Time (UTC+08:00)

|}

Final round 

 All series are best-of-three.

Semifinals 
Rank 1 vs Rank 4

|}
Rank 2 vs Rank 3

|}

Finals 
3rd Place

|}
Championships

|}

Awards

Final standings

Venues 

 Filoil Flying V Centre, San Juan (main venue)
 University of San Agustin, Iloilo City (PVL on tour)
 Imus City Sports Complex, Cavite (PVL on tour)
 Alonte Sports Arena, Biñan, Laguna (PVL on tour)
 Ynares Center, Antipolo, Rizal (PVL on tour)

Statistics

Player tournament averages

Team tournament averages

See also 
 2019 Spikers’ Turf Reinforced Conference

References

2019 in Philippine sport